The Senior Service Tournament was a professional golf tournament. The event was played from 1962 and 1966 and was sponsored by Gallaher Ltd, a tobacco company which made Senior Service cigarettes.

Winners 

The 1965 event was reduced to 54 holes because of bad weather. The first round was abandoned while the second round was played on the short West Course at Dalmahoy.

References

Golf tournaments in the United Kingdom
1962 establishments in the United Kingdom
1966 disestablishments in the United Kingdom
Recurring sporting events established in 1962
Recurring sporting events disestablished in 1966